A mountain is a type of landform. 

Mountain or Mountains may also refer to:

Places

United States
 Mountain (CDP), Wisconsin, an unincorporated community
 Mountain, North Dakota, a town
 Mountain, Wisconsin, a town
 Mountain States, one of the nine US geographic divisions; a subregion of the Western United States

Other places
 Mountain, Manitoba, a rural municipality in Canada
 Mountain Province, a province in the Cordillera Region of the Philippines
 Mountain, a hamlet in Queensbury, West Yorkshire, England

People
 Mountain (surname)
 Man Mountain Rock, later stage name used by professional wrestler Maxx Payne
 Mountain Fiji, a female professional wrestler from the Gorgeous Ladies of Wrestling

Arts, entertainment, and media

Films
 Mountain (2015 film), a 2015 Israeli film
 Mountain (2017 film), a documentary

Music

Groups
 Mountain (band), an American rock band
 Mountains (band), an American drone band who record for Thrill Jockey

Albums
 Mountain (Leslie West album), a 1969 solo album by future Mountain frontman Leslie West
 Mountain, a 2004 album by the Finnish rock band Circle
 Mountains (Steamhammer album), 1970
 Mountains (Mary Timony album), 2000
 Mountains (Lonestar album), 2006

Songs
 "Mountain" (song), a 1994 single from Chocolate Starfish's self-titled studio album
 "Mountain", a song by Good Charlotte from The Chronicles of Life and Death, 2004
 "Mountains" (Biffy Clyro song), a single released in 2008 by Biffy Clyro
 "Mountains" (Lonestar song), a 2006 single from this album
 "Mountains" (Prince song), 1986 song by Prince from the album Parade
 "Mountains", a song on the Emeli Sandé album Our Version of Events
 "Mountains", a song by Lucy Spraggan

Other music
 Mountain Records, a record label
 Mountain Music (disambiguation), several meanings

Other arts, entertainment, and media
 Mountain (advertisement), a 2003 advertisement for the PlayStation 2 video game console
 Mountain (TV series), a BBC production presented by Griff Rhys Jones
 Mountain (video game), a video game by David OReilly
 Planine (English: Mountains), a 1536 book by Croatian Petar Zoranić

Transport
 Edel Mountain, a South Korean paraglider designed for mountain descents
 Mountain Station, a train station in New Jersey, United States
 Mountain railroad steam locomotive, classified as 4-8-2 in the Whyte notation

Other uses
 Mountain climate, a crude geographical term used for the kind of climate in the mountains
 Mountain Time Zone, one of the time zones of North America
 Mountain range, a set of mountains

See also

 The Mountain (disambiguation)
 Mountain River (disambiguation)
 
 
 MountainsMap, micro-topography software published by Digital Surf
 Mount (disambiguation)
 Massif (disambiguation)
 Hill (disambiguation)